Georgs Pelēcis (also Georges Pélétsis; born 18 June 1947) is a Latvian composer and musicologist. He is currently a professor at the Latvian Academy of Music.

Compositional career
Pelēcis was born in Riga. He studied under Aram Khachaturian at the Moscow Conservatory, and has worked in a creative capacity at Oxford University and Cambridge University. His style has been described as "new consonant music", with an "amazingly clear positive spirit".

Notable works include:
Revelation, Concerto for counter-tenor, piano, and trumpet
Nevertheless, Concerto for violin, piano, and strings
Buena-Riga
The Last Song
Flowering Jasmine, Concerto for violin, vibraphone, and strings
Jack and the Beanstalk, Music for the Roald Dahl fable for symphony orchestra and narrators
Concertino bianco for piano and chamber orchestra

Musicological career
Pelēcis' musicological work focuses on musical form in work from the Middle Ages, Renaissance, and Baroque eras. He has written theses focusing on the work of Giovanni Pierluigi da Palestrina and Johannes Ockeghem.

Pelēcis teaches the history of theory and counterpoint at the Latvian Academy of Music, and was the first president of the Riga Center for Early Music.

References

External links
 Georgs Pelēcis at the Latvian Music Information Centre  
 Georgs Pelēcis at Alain Van Kerckhoven Editeur 

1947 births
Living people
Musicians from Riga
Latvian composers
Latvian musicologists
20th-century classical composers
Male classical composers
20th-century male musicians